Birds (released March 25, 2013 in Oslo, Norway by the label Edition Records – EDN1040) is the 4'th album of the Norwegian saxophonist Marius Neset.

Critical reception 

The review by Neil Spencer of the British newspaper The Guardian awarded the album 5 stars, the review by Terje Mosnes of the Norwegian newspaper Dagbladet awarded the album dice 6, the review by Carl Petter Opsahk of the Norwegian newspaper Verdens Gang awarded the album dice 5, and the reviewer Ian Mann of the Jazz Mann awarded the album 4.5 stars

According to Mosnes, with this album, Neset takes further steps on his way to the Jazz sky. The brilliant compositions and the musical skills of this band are extraordinary. It is only to look forward to the next move of this great jazz musician and composer.

NRK Jazz critique Erling Wicklund, in his review of Neset's album Birds states:
... The album's title and opening track Birds is one of the funniest tunes I've heard - a frantic but through structured rhythm chaos of a remarkable ensemble where flute, accordion and tuba are capped off by Nesets increasingly ecstatic tenor sax. And so across the great symphonic pensive, before tenor saxophonist reconnects with acrobatic leaps in a musical boxing match ...

BBC Music critique Peter Marsh, in his review of Neset's album Birds states:
... Possessed of a big, supercharged sound on the tenor, astonishing control and a steady stream of ideas, Neset shapes confident, pushy and questing solos over the fleet, pin-sharp playing of the rhythm section...

Track listing 

All compositions by Marius Neset except tracks # 6 & 7 by Marius Neset/Anton Eger

Personnel 
Band quintet
Marius Neset - tenor & soprano saxophones
Ivo Neame - piano & additional keyboards (tracks # 3,6)
Jim Hart - vibes
Jasper Høiby - double bass
Anton Eger - drums & percussion

Additional musicians
 Ingrid Neset - flute (tracks # 1,5,6,9,11) & piccolo flute (tracks # 1,9,11)
 Bjarke Mogensen - accordion (tracks # 1,9,11)
 Tobias Viklund - trumpet (tracks # 1,2,10,11)
 Ronny Farsund - trumpet (tracks # 1,2,10,11)
 Peter Jensen - trombone (tracks # 1,2,10,11)
 Lasse Mauritzen - French horn (tracks # 1,2,10,11)
 Daniel Herskedal - tuba (tracks # 1,2,10,11)

Credits 
Recorded by August Wanngren in the Village Recording, April, 2012
Mixed by August Wanngren in Wee Know Music Studios
Masered by Thomas Eberger at Stockholm Mastering
Front cower photo by Kiram Ridley
Additional photo by Linnea Høyby & Roald Vestad
Produced by Marius Neset & Anton Eger

Notes 
This record is supported by the Danish Musician Union & Coda

References

External links 
Marius Neset website

Marius Neset albums
Edition Records albums
2013 albums
2013 in Norwegian music